The 1994–95 Calgary Flames season was the 15th National Hockey League season in Calgary.  The season was shortened to 48 games by a 104-day lockout that would delay the start of the season until late January.  This season saw the continued dismantling of the 1989 championship team, as both Mike Vernon and Al MacInnis were traded prior to the lockout.

The Flames captured their second consecutive Pacific Division title, earning the second seed in the playoffs.  The division championship would be the Flames' last until they won the Northwest Division in 2005–06.

Theoren Fleury finished sixth in the league in both goals (29) and points (58). Fleury was also named to the NHL Second All-Star Team following the season.

Joe Nieuwendyk won the King Clancy Memorial Trophy as the player who "best exemplifies leadership qualities on and off the ice." He became the second Flame to win the award, preceded by Lanny McDonald, who won the trophy in its inaugural year of 1987–88.

The playoffs would be a repeat of recent disappointment for the Flames, as they were once again felled by the 7th seeded team in the West in seven games, this time by the San Jose Sharks.  The Flames lost the series despite outscoring the Sharks by 9 goals over the 7 games. Fleury was magnificent in the series, scoring 7 goals and adding 7 assists for 14 points.

Regular season
During the regular season, the Flames were shorthanded a league-high 249 times.

Season standings

Schedule and results

Playoffs
The Flames were the second seed in the Western Conference for the second year in a row, however their playoff frustration would continue as they were once again defeated in seven games, this time by the San Jose Sharks. It was a high scoring series, as the Flames set a team record for most goals in a playoff series (35), while the two teams combined for an NHL record for most goals in a seven-game series (61). The Flames tied an NHL record for most shorthanded goals in a series (5), while their nine goals in game three tied a franchise record for goals in a game.  Theo Fleury led the team tying a team record for goals in one series (7), while setting a new mark for points (14). Head coach Dave King would end up losing his job over this playoff loss. He was replaced by Pierre Page in the summer.

The Flames game 5 victory would prove to be their last playoff win until 2004 - a span of nine years, as the Flames would lose their next seven playoff games, sandwiched between a stretch of seven straight non-playoff seasons.

Player statistics

Skaters
Note: GP = Games played; G = Goals; A = Assists; Pts = Points; PIM = Penalty minutes

†Denotes player spent time with another team before joining Calgary.  Stats reflect time with the Flames only.

Goaltenders
Note: GP = Games played; TOI = Time on ice (minutes); W = Wins; L = Losses; OT = Overtime/shootout losses; GA = Goals against; SO = Shutouts; GAA = Goals against average

†Denotes player spent time with another team before joining Calgary.  Stats reflect time with the Flames only.

Transactions
The Flames were involved in the following transactions during the 1994–95 season.

Trades

Free agents

Draft picks

Calgary's picks at the 1994 NHL Entry Draft, held in Hartford, Connecticut.

Farm teams

Saint John Flames
The 1994–95 American Hockey League season was the second for the Flames' top minor league affiliate. While the Saint John Flames managed only a 27–40–13 record, they still qualified for the playoffs. They fell in the first round to the Prince Edward Island Senators four games to one. Mark Greig led the Flames with 31 goals, while he and Cory Stillman tied for the team lead with 81 points. Dwayne Roloson was the starting goaltender, posting a 16–21–8 record with a 3.42 GAA in 46 games.

See also
1994–95 NHL season

References

Player stats: 2006–07 Calgary Flames Media Guide, pg 116
Game log: 2006–07 Calgary Flames Media Guide, pg 137
Team standings:  1994–95 NHL standings @hockeydb.com
Trades: hockeydb.com player pages

Calgary Flames seasons
Calgary Flames season, 1994-95
Calg